Live is a live recording by Champion et ses G-Strings (live moniker for DJ Champion and his guitarists), released in 2007 on Saboteur Records. The package contains two discs, one in CD format and one in NTSC DVD format with no region coding. The album features a live performance featuring tracks from Champion's 2004 debut album, Chill'em All.

Track listing

CD
 "NnGg"
 "Tawoumga"
 "Two Hoboes"
 "Die In Peace"
 "Barry's Beach"
 "Keep On"
 "No Heaven"
 "Sergio's Trio"
 "Feeling Good"
 "The Plow"

DVD

Show
 "Intro"
 "NnGg"
 "Tawoumga"
 "Two Hoboes"
 "Die In Peace"
 "Barry's Beach"
 "Keep On"
 "No Heaven"
 "Sergio's Trio"
 "Feeling Good"
 "The Plow"
 "Credits"

Extras
 "Documentary"
 "Epilogue"
 "Fan Cam 1"
 "Fan Cam 2"
 "Fan Cam 3"
 "DJ Cam 1"
 "DJ Cam 2"
 "Teaser"

Technical specifications
Français / English
16:9 • PCM Stereo • Dolby Digital 5.1
DVD is NTSC and fits All Regions
Filmed in HD at the Montreal Metropolis on December 14, 2006.

The DVD also contains a Sign Guide in the Extras Section (used by Champion on stage to command the guitarists). This shows images only.

DJ Champion albums
2007 live albums
2007 video albums
Live video albums